George Beattie (16 June 1925 – 10 March 2012) was a Scottish professional footballer. An inside forward he began his career with Southampton but only played one game in the 1947–48 season.

Beattie briefly played for Gloucester City before he joined Newport County in 1950. He went on to make 113 Football League appearances for Newport scoring 26 goals.

In 1953 he joined Bradford Park Avenue and in 1955 he joined Tonbridge.

Beattie died in Newport, Wales on 10 March 2012, at the age of 86.

References

1925 births
2012 deaths
Footballers from Aberdeen
Scottish footballers
Southampton F.C. players
Newport County A.F.C. players
Bradford (Park Avenue) A.F.C. players
Gloucester City A.F.C. players
Merthyr Town F.C. players
Tonbridge Angels F.C. players
English Football League players
Association football inside forwards